Milka is a feminine given name found in Bulgaria, Slovenia, Croatia, Bosnia, Serbia and Montenegro. Notable people with the name are as follows:

Milka Babović (1928–2020), Croatian runner and journalist
Milka Canić (1944–2016), Serbian quiz show host
Milka Chulina (born 1974), Venezuelan model of Croatian descent
Milka Duno (born 1972), Venezuelan race car driver
Milka Hartman (1902-1997), Slovenian poet
Milka Loff Fernandes (born 1980), German TV presenter and actress
Milka Planinc (1924–2010), Croatian Yugoslav politician
Milka Stojanovic (born 1937), Serbian opera singer
Milka Tadić, Montenegrin political activist
Milka Ternina (1863–1941), Croatian dramatic soprano

See also
Milcah, Hebrew name מִלְכָּה (meaning "queen" or "ruler")
Malka, Hebrew name
Milka – A Film About Taboos, a 1980 Finnish film
Milko (name)

References

Serbian feminine given names
Croatian feminine given names